Kasasa could refer to:

Kasasa, Kagoshima, a town in Kawanabe District, Kagoshima Prefecture, Japan, which in 2005 became part of the city of Minamisatsuma
Kasasa, Ltd., a U.S. financial services brand